Marian Georgiev Hristov (born 29 July 1973) is a Bulgarian former professional footballer who played as a midfielder. Since his retirement from playing, he has worked as an assistant manager.

Career
Hristov's first club was PFC Balkan Botevgrad. He later played with Slavia Sofia (1994–95), Levski Sofia (1995–97), and has been champion of Germany with Kaiserslautern in 1998, reached a UEFA Cup Semi-final: 2001 and a Champions League, Quarter-final: 1999 (1997–2004). He also was the DFB-Pokal finalist in 2003.

For Bulgaria, he played at the 1998 World Cup and Euro 2004.

By 27 March 2007, Hrıstov had retired from international football. Marian Hristov had earned 45 caps and scored four times for Bulgaria.

He has also expressed an interest in coaching his country.

International goals
Scores and results list Bulgaria's goal tally first, score column indicates score after each Hristov goal.

References

External links
 
 Profile at LevskiSofia.info

Living people
1973 births
Association football midfielders
Bulgarian footballers
People from Botevgrad
1998 FIFA World Cup players
UEFA Euro 2004 players
PFC Slavia Sofia players
PFC Levski Sofia players
1. FC Kaiserslautern players
VfL Wolfsburg players
First Professional Football League (Bulgaria) players
Bundesliga players
Expatriate footballers in Germany
Bulgarian expatriate sportspeople in Germany
Bulgarian expatriate footballers
Bulgaria international footballers
Sportspeople from Sofia Province